John Scott  (born 17 February 1981 in Harrow, London) is an English darts player currently playing in World Darts Federation events.  His nickname is Gnasher.

Career

Scott made his major debut at the 2012 UK Open at the Reebok Stadium in Bolton. He lost out 4–2 to Brian Woods in the preliminary round. He qualified via the UK Open Order of Merit in tied 96th place with a total of £600 - winning £200 in three of the eight qualifying events. Scott also qualified for the Austrian Darts Open by defeating Mark Hylton in the qualifying event. He lost 6–5 in the first round of the main event to Denis Ovens.

In 2013, Scott once again qualified for the 2013 UK Open at the Reebok Stadium in Bolton, making his televised debut in a 5–2 defeat to James Hubbard. Soon after, Scott qualified for the German Darts Championship, defeating Adrian Gray and Lee Palfreyman in the qualifying event. He lost 6–5 to Arron Monk in the first round.

His tour card status expired at the beginning of 2014 and he was unsuccessful at Q School as he couldn't advance beyond the last 64 on any of the four days. Scott played in 14 of the 16 Challenge Tour events throughout the year with a solitary last 16 run being his best result.

In 2015, Scott was once again unsuccessful in regaining his Tour Card status at Q-School, but managed to qualify once again for the German Darts Championship, defeating Matt Padgett, Kevin Painter and Mark Walsh in the qualifying event, but losing first round to Maik Langendorf in the main event. He played in all 16 Challenge Tour events this year, reaching the last 16 once.

Despite not attending the PDC Q-School in January 2016, Scott took part in the amateur Riley's qualifying events for the 2016 UK Open, where he won through from the London Victoria venue to make the finals in Minehead. He drew Dean Winstanley in the first round, and was narrowly defeated 6–5.

In 2017, Scott made a return to the darts circuit, this time taking part in a handful of BDO tournaments, but the year ended with defeat in the last 32 of the 2018 BDO World Darts Championship qualifying event in Bridlington.

After some good early form in 2018, including reaching the semi finals of the Romanian Classic, he broke into the top 100 in the World Rankings, and also qualified for the 2018 UK Open, winning the amateur qualifying event in London Victoria once again. At the finals in Minehead, Scott registered his first major tournament victory, defeating Darren Johnson 6-4, before he lost to Jason Lowe in the last 96.

Despite not managing to qualify for Lakeside, John did qualify for the World Masters where he lost first round to Australia's Justin Thompson. Shortly after this, he reached his first ranking final at the Latvia Open, losing 2-6 to Darius Labanauskas and this result propelled him into the top 50 in the World Rankings for the first time.

2019 saw John claim his first BDO ranking title, winning the Estonia Open in Tallinn. He followed it up the very next day with a win of the Estonia Masters. In June 2019, Scott moved into a career high position of number 2 in the World Darts Federation rankings and continued his good form by qualifying for the 2019 BDO World Trophy, defeating Ted Hankey in the qualifiers before losing 3-5 to Wayne Warren in the main event last 32.

Despite a slow start after the enforced break during the Coronavirus pandemic, John missed out on qualification at the 2022 WDF World Darts Championship by one place in the rankings. January 2022 then saw him win his third WDF ranking title, winning the Reykjavik International Games in Iceland, moving him back up to 12th in the world rankings. Due to the Russo-Ukrainian War, the WDF on IOC advice suspended Russian players from the World Championship and this enabled Scott to play in the World Championship for the first time where he was defeated 0-2 by Johnny Haines in the last 48.

In May 2022, Scott won his fourth ranking title at the Kaunas Open in Lithuania, defeating Dennis Nilsson 5-0 in the final.

Personal life

John is an Arsenal fan and has had a season ticket since 1995.

World Championship results

WDF
 2022: First round (lost to Johnny Haines 0–2)

References

External links
John Scott's official website

1981 births
Living people
English darts players
Professional Darts Corporation former tour card holders
British Darts Organisation players
People from Harrow, London
People from the London Borough of Harrow